Sava Tires is a Slovenian tyre and other rubber related products' manufacturer, it is now a subsidiary of the Goodyear Tire and Rubber Company. It is located in Kranj, Slovenia. The company was formed in 1998 under the name Sava Tyres d.o.o., although tyre manufacturing had started in 1920.

It employs over 1,400 people. It is one of the biggest and most successful Slovenian companies. Since 2006, the company is part of Goodyear Dunlop Central & South-East Europe organisation, the headquarters of which is also located in Kranj. Tyres are produced in Slovenia (by Sava), Poland (by Dębica), France (by Goodyear and Dunlop), Turkey (by Goodyear) and Germany (by Fulda and Dunlop).

The factory's rubber products were initially sold under the Vulkan brand name. In 1931 the company was taken over by the Austrian rubber manufacturer Semperit and by the end of the 1930s various industrial and consumer products were produced from rubber, including tires.

References

External links
 
German website
Polish website
Russian website

Tire manufacturers of Slovenia
Goodyear Tire and Rubber Company
Slovenian brands
Kranj